Selemani Saidi Jafo (born 26 May 1973) is a Tanzanian CCM politician. He has been a Member of Parliament for the Kisarawe constituency since 2010.

He is also a Minister of State in the President's Office – Regional Administration and Local Government since 2017.

References

1973 births
Living people
Chama Cha Mapinduzi MPs
Chama Cha Mapinduzi politicians
Tanzanian MPs 2010–2015
Tanzanian MPs 2015–2020
Tanzanian MPs 2020–2025
Maneromango Secondary School alumni
Minaki Secondary School alumni
Sokoine University of Agriculture alumni
Southern New Hampshire University alumni